The World Monuments Watch is a flagship advocacy program of the New York-based private non-profit organization World Monuments Fund (WMF) and American Express to call to action and challenge government authorities responsible for important cultural resources to identify sites immediately at risk, and to stimulate public awareness of the tremendous need to preserve and create sustainable uses for significant heritage made by man.

Selection process
Every two years, the program publishes a select list known as the Watch List of 100 Most Endangered Sites that is in urgent need of preservation funding and protection. The sites are nominated by public authorities, local preservation groups, and qualified individuals. An independent panel of international experts then select 100 candidates from these entries to be part of the Watch List, based on the significance of the site's overall significance, the urgency of its situation, the viability of action plans to save it, and the ability of a local constituency to sustainably maintain the site in the future with the means to do so. WMF and American Express award grants to sites included on the Watch List. In addition, the leverage from the listing spurs government agencies and local donors to allocate funds and take an active role in protecting the cultural landmark.

1998 Watch List
The 1998 World Monuments Watch List of 100 Most Endangered Sites was launched on September 8, 1997, by WMF President Bonnie Burnham.

List by country/territory

Statistics by country/territory
The following countries/territories have multiple sites entered on the 1998 Watch List, listed by the number of sites:

Notes

A. Numbers list only meant as a guide on this article. No official reference numbers have been designated for the sites on the Watch List.
B. Names and spellings used for the sites were based on the official 1998 Watch List as published.
C. The references to the sites' locations were based on the official 1998 Watch List as published.

References

External links
World Monuments Fund home page
World Monuments Watch home page
1998 World Monuments Watch List

Historic preservation
1998 documents